Lucille Soong (born August 15, 1938) is a Chinese-American actress. She is best known for her main role as Grandma Huang in the television series Fresh Off the Boat (2015–2020). She has acted and appeared in films and TV series since the 1960s.

Career
At the age of 21, Soong moved from Beijing, China to Hong Kong. She was then discovered by director Lewis Gilbert and made her first uncredited screen appearance in his 1959 film Ferry to Hong Kong. After moving to London in the 1960s she went on to have single-episode roles in British film and TV series Ghost Squad, Crane, Emergency-Ward 10 and The Champions and others.

In 1969, she starred in the soap opera Coronation Street, playing the role of Billy Walker's short-term girlfriend in 5 episodes. In the show, her character suffered abuse from his mother Annie Walker, and she soon broke up with him.

After moving to Hollywood in Los Angeles, she had minor roles in films The Joy Luck Club (1993) and The Corruptor (1999). For major role, she portrayed Pei-Pei's mom in the 2003 remake of Freaky Friday; starred as hairdresser Ming in Nora's Hair Salon (2004) and Nora's Hair Salon 2: A Cut Above (2008); and played Nhung Chan in Nine Dead (2009).

Her television credits in the United States included a recurring role in 7 episodes of the ABC prime time soap Desperate Housewives, portraying Gabrielle Solis' former maid, Yao Lin. She has also appeared on Dharma & Greg (3 episodes), Passions (4 episodes), Huff, All About the Andersons, According to Jim and others.

Soong starred on the ABC show Fresh Off the Boat. She recurred in the first season, and was promoted to main cast for subsequent seasons. She portrayed Grandma Jenny Huang, grandmother of the Huang family.

Filmography

Films

Television

References

External links
 

1938 births
Living people
American film actresses
American television actresses
American people of Chinese descent
20th-century American actresses
21st-century American actresses